High Society Limited is a 1982 West German comedy film directed by Ottokar Runze and starring Elisabeth Bergner, Lilli Palmer and Hardy Krüger.

Cast
 Elisabeth Bergner as Else
 Lilli Palmer as Hilde
 Heinz Schubert as Kolbe
 Hardy Krüger as Harms
 Wolf Roth as Moll
 Hans Caninenberg as Petersen
 Vadim Glowna as Raimund
 Gerhard Olschewski as Hinrich
 Marianne Klein-Benrath as Bröse
 Uwe Dallmeier as Chef der Demolierer
Hans Irle as Kassierer

References

Bibliography 
 Bock, Hans-Michael & Bergfelder, Tim. The Concise CineGraph. Encyclopedia of German Cinema. Berghahn Books, 2009.

External links 
 
 Feine Gesellschaft - Beschränkte Haftung at filmportal.de/en

1982 films
West German films
German comedy films
1980s crime comedy films
1980s German-language films
Films directed by Ottokar Runze
Films set in Hamburg
1982 comedy films
1980s German films